The Limpopo Provincial Legislature is the primary legislative body of the South African province of Limpopo.

It is unicameral in its composition, and elects the premier and the provincial cabinet, the Limpopo Executive Council, from among the members of the leading party or coalition in the parliament.

The first legislature was inaugurated in May 1994 as the Northern Transvaal Provincial Legislature. It was renamed in 1995 to the Northern Province Provincial Legislature, and again in 2003 to the Limpopo Provincial Legislature.

The Sixth Legislature was elected on 8 May 2019 in South Africa's 2019 general election. A majority of the members belong to the African National Congress.

Powers
The Limpopo Legislature appoints the Premier of Limpopo, the head of Limpopo's provincial executive. The legislature can force the Premier to resign by passing a motion of no confidence.  Although the Executive Council is selected by the Premier, the legislature may pass a motion of no confidence to force the Premier to restructure the Council. The legislature also appoints Limpopo's delegates to the National Council of Provinces, allocating delegates to parties in proportion to the number of seats each party holds in the legislature.

The legislature has the power to pass legislation in various fields stipulated in the national constitution; in some fields the legislative power is shared with the national parliament, while in others it is solely reserved to the province alone. The fields include health, education (except universities), agriculture, housing, environmental protection, and development planning.

The legislature oversees the administration of the Limpopo provincial government, and the Premier and the members of the Executive Council are required to report to the legislature on the performance of their responsibilities. The legislature also regulates the finances of the provincial government by way of the appropriation bills which determine the provincial budget.

Election
The Provincial Legislature consists of 49 members, who are elected through a system of party list proportional representation with closed lists. In other words, each voter casts a vote for one political party, and seats in the legislature are allocated to the parties in proportion to the number of votes received. The seats are then filled by members in accordance with lists submitted by the parties before the election.

The Legislature is elected for a term of five years unless it is dissolved early. This may occur if the legislature votes to dissolve and it is at least three years since the last election, or if the Premiership falls vacant and the legislature fails to elect a new Premier within ninety days. By convention, all nine provincial legislatures and the National Assembly are elected on the same day.

The most recent election was held on 8 May 2019. The following table summarises the results.

The following table shows the composition of the provincial parliament after past elections.

Officers
The current speaker of the legislature is Rosemary Molapo, while the deputy speaker is Tshitereke Matibe.

Members

References

External links
 Official website

Legislature
Provincial legislatures of South Africa
Unicameral legislatures